Count Me Out is a 1938 Warner Bros. Merrie Melodies cartoon directed by Ben Hardaway and Cal Dalton. The short was released on December 17, 1938, and features Egghead.

Plot
Egghead decides to get rich by boxing, so he takes a boxing course on a phonograph. When he graduates, he takes on dog-like champion Biff Stew, who punches Egghead around until Egghead accidentally knocks him out. We learn this is a dream after Egghead is knocked out by his boxing equipment.

Voice cast
Mel Blanc as Record Boxing Coach, Old Mailman
Danny Webb as Egghead, Biff Stew, Charlie McCarthy Imitation
Tex Avery as Fight Referee
Joe Twerp as Fight Commentator

Home media
Count Me Out is available as a bonus feature on The Amazing Dr. Clitterhouse DVD release.

Notes
This is the second Egghead cartoon co-supervised by Cal Dalton (with Ben Hardaway). The first was A-Lad-In Bagdad (with Cal Howard).

References

External links
 

1938 films
1938 animated films
Merrie Melodies short films
1930s English-language films
Films directed by Ben Hardaway
Films directed by Cal Dalton
1930s American animated films
Films scored by Carl Stalling
Films about dreams
American boxing films
Boxing animation